Soltanabad (also Romanized as Solţānābād; also known as Saţānābād and Sūltānābād) is a village in Sardrud-e Sofla Rural District, Sardrud District, Razan County, Hamadan Province, Iran. At the 2006 census, its population was 1,454, in 331 families.

References 

Populated places in Razan County